Arthur and the Invisibles: Original Motion Picture Soundtrack is the original soundtrack to the 2006 film and was released by Atlantic Records on January 9, 2007.

Track listing

References

External links 
 Arthur and the Invisibles soundtrack site at Amazon

2000s film soundtrack albums
2007 soundtrack albums